The Taiwan Tower is a futuristic tower planned for construction in Taichung, Taiwan. It will be over 300 meters high, and have eight "Blimps" that carry people to the top of the tower. 

It will resemble a tree trunk, with the blimps resembling leaves.  The "leaves" will be able to carry up to 80 people at a time. Construction was initially planned to begin in 2012. Its design is supposed to be eco- friendly, using  natural ventilation, and dome light for basements and museums.

See also
 List of tallest buildings in Taiwan

References

 Physorg.org retrieved 11-15-11

Skyscrapers in Taiwan
Proposed skyscrapers in Taiwan
Proposed buildings and structures in Taiwan